Deborah Robertson (1959) is an Australian writer. She was born in Bridgetown, Western Australia, and lives in Melbourne.

Awards
International Dublin Literary Award, 2008: longlisted for Careless
Nita Kibble Literary Award, 2007: winner for Careless
The Age Book of the Year Award, Fiction Prize, 2007: shortlisted for Careless
Orange Prize for Fiction (UK), 2007: longlisted for Careless
New South Wales Premier's Literary Awards, Christina Stead Prize for Fiction, 2007: shortlisted for Careless
Commonwealth Writers Prize, South East Asia and South Pacific Region, Best Book, 2007: shortlisted for Careless
Miles Franklin Literary Award, 2007: shortlisted for Careless
Australian Book Industry Awards (ABIA), Australian Literary Fiction Book of the Year, 2007: shortlisted for Careless
Colin Roderick Award, 2006: winner for Careless
Western Australian Premier's Book Awards, Fiction, 2006: shortlisted for Careless
Arts Queensland Steele Rudd Australian Short Story Award, 1998: winner for Proudflesh
Katharine Susannah Prichard Award, 1991: winner for 'Babyhead'

Bibliography

Novels
 Careless (2006, Picador)
 Sweet Old World (2012, Vintage)

Short stories
 Proudflesh (1997, Fremantle Arts Centre Press)

References 

1959 births
21st-century Australian novelists
Australian women short story writers
Australian women novelists
People from Bridgetown, Western Australia
Living people
21st-century Australian women writers
21st-century Australian short story writers